Bardakçılar can refer to:

 Bardakçılar, Çamlıdere
 Bardakçılar, Çan